Prince Li may refer to any of the following princely peerages of the Qing dynasty in China:

 Prince Li (禮), created in 1636
 Prince Li (理), created in 1724